Edward Reginald Blundell Leaf Turnell ( – 23 November 1917) was a Welsh professional footballer who played as an outside right in the Football League for Glossop.

Personal life 

Turnell attended New College, Oxford. He served in the King's (Liverpool Regiment), the Royal Flying Corps and the Middlesex Regiment during the First World War. Turnell was commissioned into the Royal Flying Corps in July 1916, but an accident in October 1916 forced him to depart the Corps. He was serving as a second lieutenant on probation in the Middlesex Regiment when he was killed in an attack at Cambrai on 23 November 1917. Turnell is commemorated on the Cambrai Memorial to the Missing.

Career statistics

References

English Football League players
British Army personnel of World War I
1891 births
1917 deaths
Footballers from Aberystwyth
Welsh footballers
Association football outside forwards
Royal Flying Corps officers
Glossop North End A.F.C. players
Southport F.C. players
King's Regiment (Liverpool) officers
Middlesex Regiment officers
British military personnel killed in World War I
Alumni of New College, Oxford
1890s births